The following list of Carnegie libraries in Ohio provides detailed information on United States Carnegie libraries in Ohio, where 104 public libraries were built from 79 grants (totaling $2,846,484) awarded by the Carnegie Corporation of New York from 1899 to 1915. In addition, academic libraries were built at 7 institutions (totaling $368,445).

Key

Public libraries

Academic libraries

Notes

References

 

Note: The above references, while all authoritative, are not entirely mutually consistent. Some details of this list may have been drawn from one of the references without support from the others.  Reader discretion is advised.

 
Ohio
Libraries
Libraries